Shertzer is a surname. Notable people with the surname include:

 Marion Corwell-Shertzer (1926–2016), American journalist
 Hymie Shertzer (1909–1977), American jazz saxophonist
 Janine Shertzer (born 1956), American computational physicist

See also
 Schertzer